Daniel Adomako (born 24 December 1979) is a Ghanaian sprinter. He competed in the men's 4 × 400 metres relay at the 2000 Summer Olympics.

References

External links

1979 births
Living people
Athletes (track and field) at the 2000 Summer Olympics
Ghanaian male sprinters
Olympic athletes of Ghana
Place of birth missing (living people)